This article contains a list of notable English royal mistresses.

Henry I
Gieva de Tracy
Ansfride (born c. 1070)
Lady Sybilla Corbet of Alcester (1077 – after 1157)
Edith FitzForne
Princess Nest ferch Rhys (c. 1073 – after 1136)
Isabel de Beaumont (c. 1102 – c. 1172)

Henry II
 Rosamund Clifford (before 1150 – c. 1176):)
 Ida de Tosny was a royal ward and mistress of Henry II

Edward III
Alice Perrers (c. 1348 – 1400)

Edward IV
Jane Shore
Elizabeth Lucy

Henry VIII
 1515-1520 : Bessie Blount (c.1501 – 1540), mother of his only acknowledged illegitimate child, Henry Fitzroy, 1st Duke of Richmond and Somerset
 1520-1523 : Mary Boleyn (c.1499 – 1543), sister of his second wife, Anne, cousin of his fifth wife Catherine Howard and mother of Henry VIII's alleged children, Henry Carey, 1st Baron Hunsdon and Catherine Carey, Lady Knollys
 1535-1535 : Mary Shelton (c.1512 – c.1571), mistress during his marriage to her cousin, Anne Boleyn
Anne Stafford, Countess of Huntingdon (c.1483 – 1544), who was prosecuted for adultery in 1527

Charles II
Lucy Walter (c. 1630 – 1658)
Barbara Palmer, 1st Duchess of Cleveland (1640 – 1709)
Louise de Kérouaille, Duchess of Portsmouth (1649 – 1734)
Hortense Mancini (1646 – 1699)
Nell Gwyn (c. 1650 – 1687)
Moll Davis
Winifred Wells
Jane Roberts
Mrs. Knight
Mary Bagot, widow of Charles Berkeley, 1st Earl of Falmouth
Elizabeth Killigrew, Viscountess Shannon
Elizabeth, Countess of Kildare
Catherine Pegge (b. 1635)

James II
Anne Hyde (later his wife)
Arabella Churchill (1648 – 1730)
Catherine Sedley, Countess of Dorchester (1657 – 1717)
Elizabeth Stanhope, Countess of Chesterfield (rumoured)

William III
 Elizabeth Hamilton, Countess of Orkney (c. 1657 – 1733) (rumoured)

See also 
 List of Scottish royal mistresses
 List of Swedish royal mistresses

England

Royal  mistresses